Nugent Francis Cachemaille-Day (1896–1976), often referred to as NF Cachemaille-Day, was an English architect who designed some of the most "revolutionary" 20th-century churches in the country. His Church of St Nicholas, Burnage has been called "a milestone in the history of church architecture in England." He was a leading British exponent of Expressionist architecture.

After training at the Architectural Association, Cachemaille-Day set up practice with Felix Lander and Herbert Welch as "Welch, Cachemaille-Day, and Lander" in 1929. Their work included the Haymills Estate in Hanger Hill. In 1935 Cachemaille-Day began an independent practice. Shortly afterwards he designed the Church of St Michael and All Angels, Northenden (1936–37), which well illustrates his absorption of "Continental experiments." Pevsner described it as "a sensational church for its country and its day."

From the 1930s he became known for his churches, some of which are the most innovative ecclesiastical buildings of their time. He was one of the leading English architects to embrace the Liturgical Movement. Between 1931 and 1963 he designed at least 61 churches, many of which are now listed buildings.

His churches include St Alban's Church, Southampton, the Church of St Nicholas, Burnage and St Philip's Church, Avondale Square. The interior of St Barnabas, in Stroud Road, Gloucester, built at the foot of the Cotswolds in an estate south of the city, distills Gothic architecture into pure, simple gestures of interchanging arches within a huge hall church: the energy and dance of the Gothic is at the heart of this design, setting up a majestic yet lively space, its scale suggesting the ambition of a cathedral builder.

St Edmund, Chingford, built in 1938, is Grade II listed. A pulpit designed by Cachemaille-Day for St-John-at-Hackney church was removed from the church and sold as part of a redevelopment in 2021.

Notes

Sources

1896 births
1976 deaths
20th-century English architects
English ecclesiastical architects
Modernist architects from England